Stiletto Dance (also called High-Heels Dance) is a dance form that emerged and evolved in the United States and Europe in the late 20th and early 21st centuries. It is named after the women's shoe style, since one of its distinguishing features is the wearing of high-heeled shoes during performance.  

Heels dance is a solo dance genre often featured in routines seen in pop and hip-hop music videos. Its techniques and dance vocabulary derive from a wide range of dance styles used in music video choreography as well as traditional dance genres. It is characterized by dynamic footwork & technique from jazz dance, showgirl dance (the first style of technical dance to be performed in heels), ballroom dance and Latin dance. It is also used in some go-go dancing performances. Many other dance styles have influenced this modern day dance style: for example, torso isolations borrowed from belly dance and hip hop dance, floor work, fluid arm work and body language in some forms of heels dance coming from exotic dancing (such as pole dance floorwork) and contemporary dance.
Heels dance is technically demanding, and dancers who perform it are typically professionally trained in jazz dance & other styles, including ballet.

Heels dance is not a social dance style; it is seen mainly in the context of professional stage performance: cruise ship entertainment, backup dancers behind pop artists, or dancers in music videos. It is also practiced as a women's physical fitness movement discipline taught and practiced in workout or leisure format in dance studios or gyms.

References 

Dances of the United States
Dance culture
Contemporary dance